Alain Levent (15 September 1934 – 28 August 2008) was a French cinematographer and film director. He worked on 80 films between 1960 and 2007. His 1972 film The Bar at the Crossing was entered into the 22nd Berlin International Film Festival.

Selected filmography
 Cléo from 5 to 7 (1962)
 The Thief of Tibidabo (1964)
 The Nun (1966)
 It Rains in My Village (1968)
 Les Gauloises bleues (1968)
 L'amour fou (1969)
 Atlantic Wall (1970)
 The Bar at the Crossing (1972 - directed)
 Far West (1973)
 Dracula and Son (1976)

References

External links

1934 births
2008 deaths
French cinematographers
Film directors from Paris